Ernest Pomfret (18 April 1941 – 1 May 2001) was a British middle-distance runner. He competed in the men's 3000 metres steeplechase at the 1964 Summer Olympics.

He also represented England in the 3,000 metres steeplechase, at the 1966 British Empire and Commonwealth Games in Kingston, Jamaica.

References

1941 births
2001 deaths
Athletes (track and field) at the 1964 Summer Olympics
Athletes (track and field) at the 1966 British Empire and Commonwealth Games
British male middle-distance runners
British male steeplechase runners
Olympic athletes of Great Britain
Place of birth missing
Commonwealth Games competitors for England